Ferne Carter Pierce (September 10, 1920 – December 31, 1978), later Vincent, was an American farmer and politician who served as a Democratic member of the Illinois House of Representatives from 1957 to 1963.

Biography
Born September 10, 1920 in Selma, California, daughter of cattleman and rancher. She was educated in Selma public schools at and Mills College for Women, in Oakland, California. She married Tim J. Pierce on December 29, 1944, with whom she had three children. She and her husband farmed cattle on a 1,000 acre farm near Malta, Illinois. In 1955-56, she was secretary-treasurer of the Women's Auxiliary of the American Angus Association. She was also involved as a precinct committeeman and secretary of the DeKalb County Democratic Central Committee.

In 1956, she was elected to the Illinois House of Representatives as one of three representatives from the 32nd district. The 32nd district included all or parts of Boone, DeKalb, McHenry, and Ogle counties in northern Illinois. She served as Vice Chair of the Roads and Bridges Committee from 1961-1962. While a member of the Illinois House, she was a member of the National Order of Women Legislators. Pierce was defeated for renomination in the 1962 Democratic primary. She died in 1978.

References

1920 births
1978 deaths
20th-century American politicians
Farmers from Illinois
Women state legislators in Illinois
Democratic Party members of the Illinois House of Representatives
Mills College alumni
People from Selma, California
People from DeKalb County, Illinois
20th-century American women politicians